Chessa Field is the women's soccer field of the Ohio Bobcats. It was opened under the name of "Ohio Soccer Field" on September 6, 1997. On that day, Ohio defeated the Youngstown State University Penguins 2-0 in what was also the first home varsity women's soccer game in the history of Ohio University. 

In 2003, several renovations took place to the field thanks to a $60,000 donation from Ohio University groundskeeper Scott Blower and his wife Crista. This allowed a new grass playing surface to be installed at the field. Also, the field dimensions were expanded to the NCAA maximum, new bleachers with a capacity of 1,000 were added, a new press box were constructed, a new digital scoreboard was added to the facility, and wrought-iron fencing was erected to surround the field.

The stadium was named Chessa Field in honor of Scott and Crista Blower's daughter, Chessa Blower.

Ohio Bobcats
Soccer venues in Ohio
Buildings and structures of Ohio University
1997 establishments in Ohio
Sports venues completed in 1997